10 September (in Turkish: 10 Eylül) was a communist group in Turkey. It was formed in 1988 by a group of Communist Party of Turkey (TKP) militants who disapproved of the merger of the party into the United Communist Party of Turkey (TBKP). 10 Eylül considered itself as the true inheritors of the political legacy of TKP. The group published a magazine called 10 Eylül.

In 1996 the group merged with others to form Ürün.

References

1988 establishments in Turkey
1996 disestablishments in Turkey
Communist organizations in Turkey
Organizations disestablished in 1996
Organizations established in 1988